William Abercromby (born 14 September 1958, in Paisley) is a retired Scottish footballer.

Abercromby came through the youth ranks at St Mirren and signed a full professional contract in 1975. A year later he experienced his first involvement with the first team squad when Sir Alex Ferguson called him into the squad to tour the West Indies.

On 29 October 1986, Abercromby was sent off for three red card offences, one for foul play and two counts of dissent during a match against Motherwell at Love Street. As a result, he was banned for twelve matches. He won the 1987 Scottish Cup when St Mirren beat Dundee United 1–0 in the final. 
During the 1980s, Billy was involved in all four of St Mirren's forays into European competition, playing in nine of the club's 14 matches, more than any other Saints player.

He was transferred to Partick Thistle in 1988.

Abercromby battled with severe alcoholism when his playing days ended with his experiences and subsequent recovery being detailed in his biography 'Aber's Gonnae Get Ye'.

Abercromby was one of the ex-players involved in the after-match parade following St Mirren's last game at the Love Street (stadium) on 3 January 2009.

References

External links

1958 births
Living people
Cowdenbeath F.C. players
Dunfermline Athletic F.C. players
East Stirlingshire F.C. players
Association football midfielders
Partick Thistle F.C. players
Footballers from Glasgow
Scottish footballers
Scottish Football League players
St Mirren F.C. players